The Worshipful Company of Haberdashers, one of the Great Twelve City Livery Companies, is an ancient merchant guild of London, England associated with the silk and velvet trades.

History and functions
The Haberdashers' Company follows the Mercers' Company (inc. 1394, also connected with clothing and previously haberdashery) in precedence, receiving its first Royal Charter in 1448 and holds records dating back to 1371. The formal name under which it is incorporated is The Master and Four Wardens of the Fraternity of the Art or Mystery of Haberdashers in the City of London.

The company was originally responsible for the regulation of silk and velvet merchants, but began losing control over those trades as the population of London increased and spread outwards from the City after the Industrial Revolution. Through careful stewardship of financial bequests and funds, the company now serves as a significant educational and charitable institution whilst maintaining links with its heritage by giving awards for fashion education.

As an educational foundation, the Haberdashers' Company maintains a strong tradition of supporting schools. It founded a boys' school in Hoxton in 1690, and following redevelopment of the site, in June 1875, it reopened the school, which was now divided into two, educating boys and girls. At the same time, it opened a boys and girls school in Hatcham, South London. The Hoxton Boys' School moved to Hampstead, North London, and subsequently to Elstree in 1961 to become the Haberdashers' Aske's Boys' School, Elstree. The Girls' School, founded in Hoxton moved to Creffield Road, Acton, opening on 1 November 1889 with 47 Hoxton pupils and 12 new girls, working in a temporary iron building. In September 1974, it opened on its present site in Elstree as Haberdashers' Aske's School for Girls, adjacent to the Boys' School.

The original Hatcham schools is now run by the Haberdashers' Company, as Hatcham Academy, open to girls and boys; other schools are situated elsewhere in the United Kingdom: e.g. William Adams, a haberdasher by trade, founded in 1656 the Adams' Grammar School in his home town of Newport, Shropshire. In 1990, at Monmouth School, the Glover Music School was established funded by Dame Jane Glover, sister of Past Master Richard Glover, and daughter of a previous headmaster of the school.

In keeping with its Christian tradition, the Haberdashers' Company continues to present copies of the King James Bible to pupils at all its schools. The company owns and takes an interest in the patronage of its eight parish church advowsons.

The company is sole trustee of two major educational charities: Haberdashers' Aske's Charity and the William Jones's Schools Foundation.

The company ranks eighth in the order of precedence of City livery companies and, as such, it is recognised as one of the Great Twelve City Livery Companies. Like other livery companies, it supports the work of the Lord Mayor, the City of London Corporation and the Sheriffs of London: Alderman Sir William Russell, Second Warden (2022–23), was the first Lord Mayor of London to serve consecutive terms (2019–21) since the 19th century. The Duke of Edinburgh currently serves on the Haberdashers' Court of Assistants.
 
Haberdashers' Hall was situated near the Guildhall in Bassishaw Ward for many centuries, but from 2002 the company took additional premises in the City Ward of Farringdon Without, where it is now based.

The Haberdashers' motto is "Serve and Obey".

Haberdashers' Hall

The Haberdashers' Company moved to its new hall at 18 West Smithfield on 15 April 2002, located opposite the King Henry Gate of St. Bartholomew's Hospital.

On 24 October 2002 Queen Elizabeth II was welcomed by the Master Haberdasher, Nicholas Lund, to formally declare its Hall open.
 
Haberdashers' Hall, with its various meeting and function rooms as well as offices, is centred on a cloistered courtyard, entered through the façade at Market View, Smithfield, and also includes residential apartments and retail units. On the south side of the property, the company has developed office space which opens onto Hosier Lane.

Within the Hall, its cloisters to the right-hand side lead via a circular staircase to the first floor where its Court Room, Committee Room and a luncheon room lead off a reception gallery. The reception gallery leads to the banquet hall, which has a high vaulted ceiling and is entirely oak-panelled. There are also offices for company staff, facilities for catering staff with storage and cellars below the hall, together with accommodation for the Master and the Beadle. The Clerk to the Haberdashers' Company is Brigadier Angus Watson, and the Revd Marcus Walker serves as Honorary Chaplain.

Haberdasher Schools
Haberdashers' Abraham Darby, Madeley, Telford, Shropshire
 Haberdashers' Adams, Newport, Shropshire
 Aldersey Church of England (aided) Primary School, Bunbury, Cheshire
 Haberdashers' Agincourt School, Monmouth
 Haberdashers' Crayford Academy, Crayford, Kent
 Haberdashers' Hatcham College, London SE14
 Haberdashers' Hatcham Temple Grove School, London SE14
 Haberdashers' Knights Academy, Downham, Kent
 Haberdashers' Knights Temple Grove School, London Borough of Bromley
 Haberdashers' Boys' School, Elstree, Hertfordshire
 Haberdashers' School for Girls, Elstree, Hertfordshire
 Haberdashers' Monmouth School for Girls, Monmouth 
 Monmouth School, Monmouth
 West Monmouth School (affiliated)

List of Lord Mayors and Master Haberdasher

 1483–84: Sir Robert Billesdon
 1532–33: Sir Stephen Peacock
 1538–39: Sir William Fermor
 1552–53: Sir George Barne
 1555–56: Sir William Gerard
 1579–80: Sir Nicholas Woodroffe
 1582–83: Sir Thomas Blanke
 1586–87: Sir George Barne, MP
 1587–88: Sir George Bond
 1596–97: Sir Henry Billingsley
 1600–01: Sir William Ryder
 1601–02: Sir John Gerard
 1604–05: Sir Thomas Lowe
 1620–21: Sir Francis Jones
 1627–28: Sir Hugh Hamersley
 1631–32: Sir George Whitmore
 1632–33: Sir Nicholas Rainton
 1637–38: Sir Richard Fenn
 1652–53: John Fowke, MP
 1664–65: Sir John Lawrence
 1688–89: Sir John Chapman
 1699–00: Sir Richard Levett
 1717–18: Sir William Lewen
 1725–26: Sir Francis Forbes
 1726–27: Sir John Eyles
 1733–34: Sir William Billers
 1738–39: Micajah Perry, MP
 1794–95: The Rt Hon. Thomas Skinner
 1875–76: Sir William Cotton
 1883–84: Sir Francis Wyatt Truscott
 1891–92: Sir David Evans
 1907–08: Sir John Bell
 1915–16: Sir Charles Wakefield (later Viscount Wakefield)
 1931–32: Sir Maurice Jenks
 1956–57: Sir Cullum Welch
 1967–68: Sir Gilbert Inglefield
 1969–70: Sir Ian Frank Bowater
 2019–21: Sir William Russell

See also
 Arte della Seta
 Haberdasher
 Smithfield, London
 Zunft

References

External links
 The Haberdashers' Company website
 The Haberdashers' Company history
 History of the Haberdashers' Company 
 www.cityoflondon.gov.uk

 
Haberdashers
Great Twelve City Livery Companies
1448 establishments in England
Charities based in London
Corporatism
Companies of medieval England
Organisations based in London with royal patronage